Gudbrand is a given name. Notable people with the given name include:

Gudbrand Bøhn (1839–1906), Norwegian violinist, concertmaster, and music teacher
Gudbrand Granum (1893–1984), Norwegian politician
Gudbrand Gregersen de Saág (1824–1910), Norwegian-born Norwegian-Hungarian bridge engineer, architect and member of the Hungarian nobility
Gudbrand Helenus Hartmann (1832–1900), Norwegian schoolteacher, rector and civil servant
Gudbrand Østbye (1885–1972), Norwegian army officer and historian
Gudbrand Skatteboe (1875–1965), Norwegian rifle shooter
Gudbrand Bernhardsen Tandberg (1903–1949), Norwegian politician

Norwegian masculine given names